The 2000 NCAA Division I women's soccer tournament (also known as the 2000 Women's College Cup) was the 19th annual single-elimination tournament to determine the national champion of NCAA Division I women's collegiate soccer. The semifinals and championship game were played at Spartan Stadium in San Jose, California during December 2000. 

North Carolina defeated UCLA in the final, 2–1, to win their sixteenth, and second straight, national title. The Tar Heels (21–3) were coached by Anson Dorrance. 

The most outstanding offensive player was Meredith Florance from North Carolina, and the most outstanding defensive player was Catherine Reddick, also from North Carolina. Florance and Reddick, along with eleven other players, were named to the All-Tournament team. Florance was also the tournament's leading scorer (4 goals).

Qualification

All Division I women's soccer programs were eligible to qualify for the tournament. The tournament field remained fixed at 48 teams although it would expand to its current size, 64 teams, the following year.

Play-in games

Format
Just as before, the final two rounds, deemed the Women's College Cup were played at a pre-determined neutral site. All other rounds were played on campus sites at the home field of the higher-seeded team. The top sixteen teams were given a bye to the Second Round while the remaining thirty-two teams played in the preliminary First Round.

Teams

Bracket

All-tournament team
Daniella Borgman, North Carolina
Meotis Erickson, Notre Dame
Meredith Florance, North Carolina (most outstanding offensive player)
Karissa Hampton, UCLA
Venus James, UCLA
Jena Kluegel, North Carolina
Cheryl Loveless, Portland
Lauren Orlandos, Portland
Kim Patrick, North Carolina
Catherine Reddick, North Carolina (most outstanding defensive player)
Liz Wagner, Notre Dame
Jordan Walker, North Carolina
Amy Warner, Notre Dame

See also 
 NCAA Division II Women's Soccer Championship
 NCAA Division III Women's Soccer Championship

References

NCAA
NCAA Women's Soccer Championship
NCAA Division I Women's Soccer Tournament
NCAA Division I Women's Soccer Tournament
NCAA Division I Women's Soccer Tournament
 
Women's sports in California